Menuthia is a monotypic snout moth genus described by Émile Louis Ragonot in 1888. Its only species, described in the same publication, Menuthia nanella, is found in Tanzania.

References

Moths described in 1888
Anerastiini
Monotypic moth genera
Moths of Africa
Pyralidae genera
Taxa named by Émile Louis Ragonot